Svenska Cupen 1970–71 was the sixteenth season of the main Swedish football Cup. The competition was concluded on 30 June 1971 with the final, held at Malmö Stadion, Malmö. Åtvidabergs FF won 3-2 against Malmö FF before an attendance of 7,544 spectators.

Group stage
For all results see SFS-Bolletinen - Matcher i Svenska Cupen.

First round
For all results see SFS-Bolletinen - Matcher i Svenska Cupen.

Second round
For all results see SFS-Bolletinen - Matcher i Svenska Cupen.

Third round
For all results see SFS-Bolletinen - Matcher i Svenska Cupen.

Fourth round
For all results see SFS-Bolletinen - Matcher i Svenska Cupen.

Fifth round
For all results see SFS-Bolletinen - Matcher i Svenska Cupen.

Quarter-finals
The quarter finals were held on 4 and 5 April 1971.

Semi-finals
The semi-finals were played on 5 May 1971.

Final
The final was played on 30 June 1971 at Malmö Stadion.

Footnotes

References 

Svenska Cupen seasons
Cupen
Cupen
Sweden